Stylianos Gonatas (15 August 1876 – 29 March 1966) was an officer of the Hellenic Army, Venizelist politician, and Prime Minister of Greece from 1922 to 1924.

Early life and military career
Gonatas was born in Patras. He entered the Hellenic Military Academy in 1892 and graduated in 1897. As a lieutenant, he participated in the Macedonian Struggle (1907–1909), and became aide-de-camp to Colonel Nikolaos Zorbas immediately following the 1909 Goudi Revolt. He also participated in the 1912-13 Balkan Wars and in the Allied Expedition to the Ukraine in 1919. Subsequently, he took part in the Asia Minor Campaign with the rank of colonel, first as a staff officer and later as divisional commander.

The September 1922 Revolt

In August 1922, the Greek Army was defeated in its Asia Minor campaign, which forced it to evacuate Anatolia in great haste. In Greece, this disaster led to a political crisis, and military revolts broke out in September amongst the evacuated troops in Thessaloniki, Chios and Lesbos, headed primarily by Venizelist officers.

The army contingents in Lesbos formed a Revolutionary Committee headed by Colonel Gonatas, which dispatched by airplane the following demands to Athens: the dismissal of the government, the dissolution of Parliament, the holding of new elections, and the abdication of King Constantine in favour of the Diadoch, Prince George. The revolutionary movement swiftly spread to other centres of old and new Greece, aided by the Fleet, which had joined their cause. The cabinet immediately resigned, and on 27 September King Constantine abdicated for the second time in the course of his career, and the Diadoch succeeded to the throne of Greece as King George II.On 28 September the revolutionary troops, headed by their leaders, Colonels Nikolaos Plastiras and Gonatas, entered Athens amidst wild scenes of enthusiasm. The revolutionary committee which took charge selected Alexandros Zaimis as Prime Minister, but as he was out of the country, Sotirios Krokidas was appointed as interim Prime Minister.

As prime minister

The first cabinet formed under the regime of the Revolutionary Committee (which had established itself as the real master of Greece with King George II merely as a figurehead) underwent several slight changes, the chief of which was caused by the refusal of Zaimis to retain the premiership (which remained vacant, with Sotirios Krokidas as acting premier), and after having been in power for less than two months resigned on 24 November, chiefly owing to internal differences arising from the Trial of the Six (ex-ministers, statesmen, and military leaders tried by a revolutionary tribunal on the charges of high treason). The British government, through its minister in Athens, Lindley, urged that the accused should be treated leniently. While certain members of the cabinet were prepared to accept the British suggestion, the more irreconcilable elements refused to submit to what they considered as foreign intervention in Greek internal affairs, and the cabinet accordingly resigned.  On 27 November 1922 a new cabinet, composed exclusively of members of the Revolutionary Committee and of the republican group which formed the committee's most active supporters, was appointed. Colonel Gonatas was appointed premier, and Konstantinos Rentis, one of the leaders of the republican group, as acting minister for foreign affairs (see 1922 Government Crisis).

The Gonatas government served until 11 January 1924, when it resigned in favor of fellow-liberal Eleftherios Venizelos, who had returned from exile in Paris. For his service, Gonatas was given the Grand Cross of the Order of the Redeemer. On 31 May 1924, the National Assembly promoted him and Plastiras to the rank of lieutenant general.

Later political career

After his service as Prime Minister, Gonatas resigned his commission in the army. In the same year, a Republic was proclaimed and the legislature expanded to include a second house: the Senate. Gonatas ran for and was elected to the Senate as a Liberal in the 1929 election representing Attica and Boeotia. He was re-elected and later served as President of the Senate from 1932 to its dissolution in 1935.

During the Nazi Occupation of Greece, Gonatas was imprisoned in the Haidari concentration camp for four months. After the German withdrawal, Gonatas was freed and re-entered political life. When he quarrelled with Themistoklis Sophoulis, the leader of the Liberal Party, he formed his own party, the Party of National Liberals (Κόμμα Εθνικών Φιλελευθέρων) which contested the 1946 general election in coalition with the conservative People's Party. Gonatas' party elected 30 members of Parliament. Having joined forces with the monarchist party, Gonatas committed himself to support the restoration of the monarchy in the 1946 plebiscite, which restored King George II to the throne.

In the Konstantinos Tsaldaris government from 1946–1947, he served as Minister for Public Works. In the 1950 general election, Gonatas' party first allied with Napoleon Zervas' National Party of Greece but when he was discredited for his collaboration with the Nazis, Gonatas decided to run in coalition with the Liberal Party. In this election, for the first time in his political career, Gonatas was not elected. He never sought public office again; continuing only to serve as former Prime Ministers did on the Crown Council advising the King until his death on March 29, 1966, in Athens.

See also
 Corfu incident

References

1876 births
1966 deaths
20th-century prime ministers of Greece
Military personnel from Patras
Liberal Party (Greece) politicians
United Alignment of Nationalists politicians
Prime Ministers of Greece
Government ministers of Greece
Members of the Greek Senate 1929–1932
Members of the Greek Senate 1932–1935
Speakers of the Hellenic Parliament
Greek MPs 1946–1950
Hellenic Army lieutenant generals
Greek military personnel of the Balkan Wars
Greek military personnel of the Greco-Turkish War (1919–1922)
Greek military personnel of the Russian Civil War
National Republican Greek League members
Republicanism in Greece
Recipients of the Cross of Valour (Greece)
Ministers of the Interior of Greece
Politicians from Patras